American Church Union (ACU) is the name of several distinct Anglican organizations in the American Episcopal Church and the Anglican Continuum. The groups have had an Anglo-Catholic orientation. It is named in imitation of the English Church Union.

The first American Church Union held its inaugural annual meeting at Trinity Church, Wall Street, on April 23, 1868. It participated in controversies about Anglican Ritualism and emerging Anglo-Catholicism in the Episcopal Church.

Another group calling itself the American Church Union was organized in 1908 in response to the Open Pulpit Controversy of William McGarvey and his followers in the Congregation of the Companions of the Holy Saviour (CSSS). It organized Anglo-Catholic Episcopalians who resisted departures to the Roman Catholic Church. This ACU subsequently became the Churchman's Alliance, which organized events and publications in the 1910s and 1920s. 

On May 31, 1936, a third American Church Union was organized as an outgrowth of the Catholic Congress movement of the Episcopal Church. The purpose of this ACU was: "To uphold the doctrine, discipline and worship of the Episcopal Church, to extend the knowledge of the Catholic Faith and Practice of the Church at home and abroad; to seek thereby to bring everyone to worship and serve our Lord Jesus, Saviour and King." The current ACU organization had offices in New York City, Pelham Manor, and Berkeley, California.

This American Church Union was incorporated in 1947 in California with EIN 13-1883818 and is currently a publishing imprint of the Anglican Province of Christ the King. Its periodical American Church News was the immediate predecessor of The New Oxford Review (NOR); NOR was formed in 1984 when the majority of American Church News staff and writers became Roman Catholics. The ACU also sponsored a youth wing known as the Servants of Christ the King, with its own rule of life and annual events.

During its existence in the Episcopal Church, the ACU provided resources and political organization for many allied causes, such as removing the word Protestant from the official name of the church, opposing the creation of the united churches of South India and North India, resisting changes to marriage discipline, promoting fasting before reception of communion, offering advice on liturgical revision and canonical changes, attempting to derail the creation of the jurisdiction of Navajoland, and eventually removing itself from the Episcopal Church over the ordination of women to the priesthood. It was a sponsor of The Living Church weekly magazine, and issued an internal cycle of prayer for member parishes, tracts, and a directory of churches in sympathy with its aims.

After the decision of most ACU members to join several bodies that left the Episcopal Church from 1976 onward, the Church Union sold its retreat center and mansion at 60 Rockledge Drive, Pelham, New York in order to settle indebtedness toward contracted employees who remained Episcopalians.

Notable members
Reginald R. Belknap
Albert A. Chambers
George H. Clendenin SSC
Edward Darrach
Albert J. duBois, executive director 1950-1974
William Elwell
Howard Lane Foland
Loren N. Gavitt
Washington Irving III
Perry Laukhuff
Ella Lingley (1889-1983, ACU secretary 1945-1974)
Admiral Ephraim R. McLean
Frederic Cook Morehouse, publisher
Robert S. Morse, executive director 1976-2015
Henry Harrison Oberly
Charles H. Osborn, executive director 1974-1976
Jerome Politzer
Thomas Newton Whiteside Rae
Roy Rogers, American singer and actor
George W. Rutler
John Stoll Sanders (1947-2021, manager and director of publications)
Judge F. H. Schlichting
Ruth C. Sloan (1924-2013)
William Knipe Tinkham
Frank L. Vernon

Bibliography
Elliot White, The American Church Union: Its Origin, Organization, Aims, Principles, Methods, and Work
Canon Nineteen: What It Is, How We Got It, and How It Works
Frank L. Vernon, Union or Unity?
F. C. Morehouse, Protestant Episcopal: An Appreciation
M. M. Benton, Unity and the Change of Name
G. Woolsey Hodge, Why Protestant
Frank L. Vernon, The Reconciliation of the Schools of Thought
W. A. Buchanan, Why Not Our True Name?
Elliot White, What Is a Catholic?
Louis T. Scofield, Confirmation

References
C. Clarke Kennedy, "The American Church Union—A Rebirth" (1936) from The Living Church
Clinton Rogers Woodruff, An Earlier American Church Union (1936)
American Church News from archive.org

See also
The Church Union (formerly English Church Union)
Swedish Church Union
Albert J. duBois

External links
Official website
Historical documents from and about the American Church Union from Project Canterbury

Anglo-Catholicism
Anglican organizations
Religious organizations established in 1868